Axel Wöstmann (born 12 April 1961) is a German rower. He competed in the men's coxless pair event at the 1984 Summer Olympics.

References

1961 births
Living people
German male rowers
Olympic rowers of West Germany
Rowers at the 1984 Summer Olympics
Sportspeople from Osnabrück